Turbo laetus is a species of sea snail, marine gastropod mollusk in the family Turbinidae.

 Taxonomic status: Some authors place the name in the subgenus Turbo (Euninella)

Description
The length of the shell varies between 50 mm and 75 mm. The conoid, imperforate shell is spirally lirat. It is smooth, pale flesh colored, and painted with large radiating ferrugineous maculations. The lirae number about nine on the body whorl, alternately smaller, the third much elevated forming an angle. The lirae of the base of the shell are slightly elevated, white and black maculated. The columella is surrounded by an orange colored area. The aperture is subcircular and silvery within.

Distribution
This marine species occurs from Southeast Africa, to Tanzania and the Gulf of Oman.

References

 Spry, J.F. (1961). The sea shells of Dar es Salaam: Gastropods. Tanganyika Notes and Records 56 
 Kilburn, R. N. 1972. Taxonomic notes on South African marine Mollusca (2), with the description of new species and subspecies of Conus, Nassarius, Vexillum and Demoulia. Annals of the Natal Museum 21(2):391–437, 15 figs.
 Steyn, D.G. & Lussi, M. (1998) Marine Shells of South Africa. An Illustrated Collector’s Guide to Beached Shells. Ekogilde Publishers, Hartebeespoort, South Africa, ii + 264 pp. page(s): 26 
 Alf A. & Kreipl K. (2003). A Conchological Iconography: The Family Turbinidae, Subfamily Turbininae, Genus Turbo. Conchbooks, Hackenheim Germany. 
 Williams, S.T. (2007). Origins and diversification of Indo-West Pacific marine fauna: evolutionary history and biogeography of turban shells (Gastropoda, Turbinidae). Biological Journal of the Linnean Society, 2007, 92, 573–592.

External links
 

laetus
Gastropods described in 1849
Taxa named by Rodolfo Amando Philippi